Judgment of God may refer to:
Judgement of God, the English language title for the 1952 French film Le Jugement de Dieu;
Eschatology, the theological field dealing with the ultimate destiny of humans and the universe, including
The Last Judgment in Christian eschatology
Qiyamah in Islamic eschatology
Jewish eschatology